Laska is a Slavic surname. Notable people with the name include:
 Katarzyna Łaska (1979), Polish singer
 Pashk Laska (1948), Albanian businessman
 Susie Laska (1979), Canadian ice hockey player
 Václav Láska (mathematician) (1862–1943), Czech astronomer, geophysicist, and mathematician

References 

Surnames
Albanian-language surnames
Surnames from nicknames